Čepelica is a village and the small river in the municipality of Bileća, Republika Srpska, Bosnia and Herzegovina.

References

Villages in Republika Srpska
Populated places in Bileća
Lower Horizons Hydroelectric Power Stations System
Trebišnjica